The 1958–59 season was the fifty-seventh season in which Dundee competed at a Scottish national level, playing in Division One, where the club would finish in 4th place, their highest since the 1950–51 season. Dundee would also compete in both the Scottish Cup and the Scottish League Cup. They would be knocked out in the group stage of the League Cup, and would be eliminated by Highland League side Fraserburgh in one of the biggest upsets in Scottish Cup history.

Scottish Division One 

Statistics provided by Dee Archive.

League table

Scottish League Cup 

Statistics provided by Dee Archive.

Group 3

Group 3 table

Scottish Cup 

Statistics provided by Dee Archive.

Player Statistics 
Statistics provided by Dee Archive

|}

See also 

 List of Dundee F.C. seasons

References

External links 

 1958-59 Dundee season on Fitbastats

Dundee F.C. seasons
Dundee